Beyond Hell/Above Heaven was a concert tour by Danish rock group, Volbeat in support for the album Beyond Hell/Above Heaven.

The tour started with Volbeat as a support act for Metallica and AC/DC including doing European festivals.

The tour is documented on the concert film "Live from Beyond Hell/Above Heaven", filmed in Copenhagen in 2010, Anaheim and Rock am Ring.

Set list
This set list is representative of the November 15, 2010 show in Hamburg. It does not represent all dates of the tour.

 "The Mirror and The Ripper"
 "Maybellene I Hofteholder"
 "Hallelujah Goat"
 "16 Dollars"
 "Heaven Nor Hell"
 "Guitar Gangsters & Cadillac Blood"
 "Soulweeper"
 "Who They Are"
 "Evelyn"
 "Mary Ann's Place"
 "Sad Man's Tongue"
 "We"
 "I Only Wanna Be With You"
 "Pool of Booze, Booze, Booza"

Encore
 "A Warrior's Call"
 "Still Counting"
 "The Garden's Tale"

Encore 2
 "Fallen"
 "Thanks"
 "The Human Instrument"

Tour dates

Personnel 
Michael Poulsen (Vocal & Rhythm Guitar)
Anders Kjølholm (Bass & Backing Vocals)
Thomas Bredahl (Lead Guitar & Backing Vocals)
Jon Larsen (Drums)

References

External links
 

2010 concert tours
2011 concert tours
2012 concert tours
Volbeat concert tours
Concerts at Malmö Arena